The 2013 Samoa Cup was the third edition of the Samoa Cup, a domestic cup played by the teams of the year's Samoa National League participants. This cup was won by Lupe o le Soaga for the first time, winning over runners-up Kiwi FC 2-1 in the overall final.

References 

Samoa Cup